Aporosa symplocifolia is a species of plant in the family Phyllanthaceae. It is endemic to the Philippines. Under the synonym Aporosa elliptifolia, it was classed as "vulnerable" in 1998, but in 2021, it is classed as of "least concern".

References

Flora of the Philippines
symplocifolia
Vulnerable plants
Taxonomy articles created by Polbot